Richard Ahiagbah is the Director of Communications for the New Patriotic Party in Ghana.

Early Life 
Ahiagbah is a native of Aflao, a suburb of the Volta Region in Ghana. He is married and has a daughter.

Education 
Ahiagbah is an alumnus of the West London College, Illinois Central College, Illinois State University and the University of Illinois.

Career 
Richard Ahiagbah is currently the Director of Communications at the New Patriotic Party. He doubles as the Deputy Director of Research at the Office of the President. Ahiagbah began his professional career at the Fiscal Policy Centre and also as a Legislative Liaison for Oneok Hydrocarbons in the United States.

Politics

USA 
He worked as a field organizer for President Barack Obama’s re-election campaign in 2012.

Ghana 
Ahiagbah works as the Director of Communication for the New Patriotic Party in Ghana.

References 

Year of birth missing (living people)
Living people
Illinois Central College alumni
Illinois State University alumni
University of Illinois alumni